During World War II, the United States Army Air Forces (USAAF) established numerous airfields in Tennessee for training pilots and aircrews of USAAF fighters and bombers.

Most of these airfields were under the command of Third Air Force or the Army Air Forces Training Command (AAFTC) (A predecessor of the current-day United States Air Force Air Education and Training Command).  However the other USAAF support commands (Air Technical Service Command (ATSC); Air Transport Command (ATC) or Troop Carrier Command) commanded a significant number of airfields in a support roles.

It is still possible to find remnants of these wartime airfields. Many were converted into municipal airports, some were returned to agriculture and several were retained as United States Air Force installations and were front-line bases during the Cold War. Hundreds of the temporary buildings that were used survive today, and are being used for other purposes.

Major Airfields 

Army Air Force Training CommandAAF Southeast Training Center
 Nashville AAC, Nashville (Non-Flying Facility)
 Aviation Cadet Classification Center
 526th Army Air Force Base Unit

Eastern Flying Training Command
 Smyrna AAF, Smyrna, Tennessee
 313th Army Air Force Base Unit
 Was: Sewart AAF until 1947, then Sewart Air Force Base (1947-1971)
 Now: Smyrna Airport and  Army Aviation Support Facility #1, Tennessee Army National Guard 
 William Northern Field, Tullahoma
 Sub-base of Smyrna AAF
 343d Army Air Force Base Unit
 Now:  Tullahoma Regional Airport

Air Transport Command
 Memphis AAF, Memphis
 4th Ferrying Group
 Joint use USAAF/Civil Airport/US Navy
 346th Army Air Force Base Unit
 Now: Memphis International Airport and  Memphis Air National Guard Base
 Berry Field/Nashville Municipal Airport, Nashville, Tennessee
 20th Ferrying Group
 Joint use USAAF/Civil Airport
 508th Army Air Force Base Unit
 Now Nashville International Airport and  Berry Field Air National Guard Base

Third Air Force
 Arnold Field/Dyersburg AAF, Dyersburg
 419th Army Air Force Base Unit

References
 Maurer, Maurer (1983). Air Force Combat Units Of World War II. Maxwell AFB, Alabama: Office of Air Force History. .
 Ravenstein, Charles A. (1984). Air Force Combat Wings Lineage and Honors Histories 1947-1977. Maxwell AFB, Alabama: Office of Air Force History. .
 Thole, Lou (1999), Forgotten Fields of America : World War II Bases and Training, Then and Now - Vol. 2.  Pictorial Histories Pub . 
 Military Airfields in World War II - Tennessee

 01
World War II
World War II
Ten
World War II
United States World War II army airfields